This is a list of butterflies of Zambia. About 900 species are known from Zambia, 27 of which are endemic.

Papilionidae

Papilioninae

Papilionini
Papilio nireus nireus Linnaeus, 1758
Papilio nireus lyaeus Doubleday, 1845
Papilio desmondi usambaraensis (Koçak, 1980)
Papilio thuraui occidua Storace, 1951
Papilio dardanus dardanus Brown, 1776
Papilio dardanus tibullus Kirby, 1880
Papilio constantinus constantinus Ward, 1871
Papilio constantinus mweruanus Joicey & Talbot, 1927
Papilio phorcas congoanus Rothschild, 1896
Papilio phorcas nyikanus Rothschild & Jordan, 1903
Papilio demodocus Esper, [1798]
Papilio echerioides homeyeri Plötz, 1880
Papilio jacksoni nyika Cottrell, 1963
Papilio pelodurus vesper Le Cerf, 1924
Papilio ophidicephalus ophidicephalus Oberthür, 1878
Papilio ophidicephalus cottrelli van Son, 1966
Papilio ophidicephalus mkuwadzi Gifford, 1961
Papilio mackinnoni isokae (Hancock, 1984)
Papilio mackinnoni theodori Riley, 1921

Leptocercini
Graphium antheus (Cramer, 1779)
Graphium policenes (Cramer, 1775)
Graphium porthaon (Hewitson, 1865)
Graphium angolanus (Goeze, 1779)
Graphium taboranus (Oberthür, 1886)
Graphium schaffgotschi (Niepelt, 1927)
Graphium ridleyanus (White, 1843)
Graphium leonidas (Fabricius, 1793)
Graphium poggianus (Honrath, 1884)
Graphium deliae Libert & Collins, 2007

Pieridae

Pseudopontiinae
Pseudopontia paradoxa (Felder & Felder, 1869)

Coliadinae
Eurema brigitta (Stoll, [1780])
Eurema desjardinsii marshalli (Butler, 1898)
Eurema mandarinula (Holland, 1892)
Eurema regularis (Butler, 1876)
Eurema floricola leonis (Butler, 1886)
Eurema hapale (Mabille, 1882)
Eurema hecabe solifera (Butler, 1875)
Eurema senegalensis (Boisduval, 1836)
Eurema upembana (Berger, 1981)
Catopsilia florella (Fabricius, 1775)
Colias electo electo (Linnaeus, 1763)
Colias electo hecate Strecker, 1905

Pierinae
Colotis amata calais (Cramer, 1775)
Colotis antevippe gavisa (Wallengren, 1857)
Colotis aurigineus (Butler, 1883)
Colotis celimene amina (Hewitson, 1866)
Colotis danae annae (Wallengren, 1857)
Colotis dissociatus (Butler, 1897)
Colotis euippe mediata Talbot, 1939
Colotis evagore antigone (Boisduval, 1836)
Colotis evenina casta (Gerstaecker, 1871)
Colotis hildebrandtii (Staudinger, 1884)
Colotis incretus (Butler, 1881)
Colotis ione (Godart, 1819)
Colotis pallene (Hopffer, 1855)
Colotis regina (Trimen, 1863)
Colotis vesta mutans (Butler, 1877)
Colotis vesta rhodesinus (Butler, 1894)
Colotis eris (Klug, 1829)
Colotis subfasciatus ducissa (Dognin, 1891)
Eronia cleodora Hübner, 1823
Eronia leda (Boisduval, 1847)
Pinacopterix eriphia (Godart, [1819])
Nepheronia argia argolisia (Stoneham, 1957)
Nepheronia argia mhondana (Suffert, 1904)
Nepheronia buquetii (Boisduval, 1836)
Nepheronia thalassina sinalata (Suffert, 1904)
Nepheronia thalassina verulanus (Ward, 1871)
Leptosia alcesta inalcesta Bernardi, 1959
Leptosia hybrida somereni Bernardi, 1959
Leptosia nupta pseudonupta Bernardi, 1959

Pierini
Appias epaphia contracta (Butler, 1888)
Appias sabina (Felder & Felder, [1865])
Appias sylvia nyasana (Butler, 1897)
Mylothris agathina (Cramer, 1779)
Mylothris alcuana shaba Berger, 1981
Mylothris bernice overlaeti Berger, 1981
Mylothris crawshayi Butler, 1896
Mylothris mavunda Hancock & Heath, 1985 (endemic)
Mylothris rhodope (Fabricius, 1775)
Mylothris rubricosta (Mabille, 1890)
Mylothris rueppellii rhodesiana Riley, 1921
Mylothris sagala albissima Talbot, 1944
Mylothris sagala dentatus Butler, 1896
Mylothris schumanni zairiensis Berger, 1981
Mylothris similis dollmani Riley, 1921
Mylothris yulei Butler, 1897
Dixeia doxo parva Talbot, 1943
Dixeia leucophanes Vári, 1976
Dixeia pigea (Boisduval, 1836)
Belenois aurota (Fabricius, 1793)
Belenois calypso crawshayi Butler, 1894
Belenois creona severina (Stoll, 1781)
Belenois diminuta Butler, 1894
Belenois gidica abyssinica (Lucas, 1852)
Belenois rubrosignata (Weymer, 1901)
Belenois thysa (Hopffer, 1855)
Belenois welwitschii welwitschii Rogenhofer, 1890
Belenois welwitschii shaba Berger, 1981
Belenois zochalia agrippinides (Holland, 1896)

Lycaenidae

Miletinae

Liphyrini
Aslauga latifurca Cottrell, 1981
Aslauga marshalli Butler, 1899
Aslauga orientalis Cottrell, 1981
Aslauga purpurascens Holland, 1890
slauga vininga kiellandi Libert, 1997

Miletini
Megalopalpus zymna (Westwood, 1851)
Spalgis lemolea Druce, 1890
Lachnocnema bibulus (Fabricius, 1793)
Lachnocnema durbani Trimen & Bowker, 1887
Lachnocnema intermedia Libert, 1996
Lachnocnema regularis Libert, 1996
Lachnocnema brimoides Libert, 1996
Lachnocnema disrupta Talbot, 1935

Poritiinae

Liptenini
Alaena amazoula nyasana Hawker-Smith, 1933
Alaena nyassa marmorata Hawker-Smith, 1933
Alaena reticulata Butler, 1896
Alaena unimaculosa aurantiaca Butler, 1895
Pentila pauli elisabetha Hulstaert, 1924
Pentila pauli nyassana Aurivillius, 1899
Pentila pauli obsoleta Hawker-Smith, 1933
Pentila umangiana meridionalis Berger, 1981
Telipna nyanza katangae Stempffer, 1961
Ornipholidotos katangae Stempffer, 1947
Ornipholidotos overlaeti Stempffer, 1947
Ornipholidotos peucetia (Hewitson, 1866)
Cooksonia neavei rhodesiae Pinhey, 1962
Mimacraea marshalli Trimen, 1898
Mimacraea skoptoles Druce, 1907
Liptena eukrines Druce, 1905
Liptena homeyeri Dewitz, 1884
Liptena lualaba Berger, 1981
Liptena praestans congoensis Schultze, 1923
Liptena xanthostola xantha (Grose-Smith, 1901)
Eresina bilinea Talbot, 1935
Eresina katangana Stempffer, 1956
Eresina toroensis Joicey & Talbot, 1921
Citrinophila terias Joicey & Talbot, 1921
Argyrocheila bitje Bethune-Baker, 1915
Teriomima puella Kirby, 1887
Teriomima puellaris (Trimen, 1894)
Baliochila hildegarda (Kirby, 1887)
Cnodontes pallida (Trimen, 1898)
Cnodontes vansomereni Stempffer & Bennett, 1953

Epitolini
Toxochitona sankuru Stempffer, 1961
Teratoneura congoensis Stempffer, 1954
Cerautola crowleyi congdoni Libert & Collins, 1999
Cerautola fisheri Libert & Collins, 1999 (endemic)
Cerautola miranda vidua (Talbot, 1935)
Stempfferia ginettae meridionalis Libert, 1999
Cephetola izidori zambeziae Libert & Collins, 1999
Cephetola katerae (Jackson, 1962)
Cephetola viridana (Joicey & Talbot, 1921)
Deloneura subfusca Hawker-Smith, 1933
Hewitsonia kirbyi Dewitz, 1879

Aphnaeinae
Pseudaletis mazanguli Neave, 1910
Lipaphnaeus eustorgia (Hulstaert, 1924)
Lipaphnaeus leonina bitje (Druce, 1910)
Lipaphnaeus leonina loxura (Rebel, 1914)
Chloroselas mazoensis (Trimen, 1898)
Chloroselas overlaeti Stempffer, 1956
Chloroselas pseudozeritis (Trimen, 1873)
Crudaria leroma (Wallengren, 1857)
Cigaritis brunnea (Jackson, 1966)
Cigaritis cynica (Riley, 1921)
Cigaritis ella (Hewitson, 1865)
Cigaritis homeyeri (Dewitz, 1887)
Cigaritis modestus heathi (d'Abrera, 1980)
Cigaritis mozambica (Bertoloni, 1850)
Cigaritis natalensis (Westwood, 1851)
Cigaritis overlaeti (Bouyer, 1998)
Cigaritis phanes (Trimen, 1873)
Cigaritis pinheyi (Heath, 1983) (endemic)
Cigaritis trimeni (Neave, 1910)
Zeritis fontainei Stempffer, 1956
Zeritis sorhagenii (Dewitz, 1879)
Axiocerses tjoane tjoane (Wallengren, 1857)
Axiocerses tjoane rubescens Henning & Henning, 1996
Axiocerses bambana orichalcea Henning & Henning, 1996
Axiocerses nyika Quickelberge, 1984
Axiocerses heathi Henning & Henning, 1996 (endemic)
Axiocerses melanica melanica Henning & Henning, 1996 (endemic)
Axiocerses melanica aurata Henning & Henning, 1996 (endemic)
Axiocerses coalescens Henning & Henning, 1996
Axiocerses amanga (Westwood, 1881)
Aloeides damarensis mashona Tite & Dickson, 1973
Aloeides conradsi angoniensis Tite & Dickson, 1973
Aloeides molomo mumbuensis Riley, 1921
Aloeides griseus Riley, 1921 (endemic)
Erikssonia acraeina Trimen, 1891
Erikssonia alaponoxa Henning & Henning, 2001 (endemic)
Aphnaeus affinis Riley, 1921
Aphnaeus erikssoni erikssoni Trimen, 1891
Aphnaeus erikssoni rex Aurivillius, 1909
Aphnaeus flavescens Stempffer, 1954
Aphnaeus marshalli Neave, 1910
Aphnaeus orcas (Drury, 1782)
Aphnaeus questiauxi Aurivillius, 1903

Theclinae
Myrina dermaptera nyassae Talbot, 1935
Myrina silenus silenus (Fabricius, 1775)
Myrina silenus ficedula Trimen, 1879
Oxylides feminina (Sharpe, 1904)
Dapidodigma demeter nuptus Clench, 1961
Hypolycaena antifaunus (Westwood, 1851)
Hypolycaena auricostalis (Butler, 1897)
Hypolycaena buxtoni spurcus Talbot, 1929
Hypolycaena hatita japhusa Riley, 1921
Hypolycaena liara plana Talbot, 1935
Hypolycaena pachalica Butler, 1888
Hypolycaena philippus (Fabricius, 1793)
Hemiolaus caeculus caeculus (Hopffer, 1855)
Hemiolaus caeculus vividus Pinhey, 1962
Leptomyrina hirundo (Wallengren, 1857)
Leptomyrina gorgias sobrina Talbot, 1935
Leptomyrina handmani Gifford, 1965
Iolaus bolissus Hewitson, 1873
Iolaus alienus Trimen, 1898
Iolaus aurivillii Röber, 1900
Iolaus australis Stevenson, 1937
Iolaus bakeri (Riley, 1928)
Iolaus coelestis Bethune-Baker, 1926
Iolaus congdoni (Kielland, 1985)
Iolaus cytaeis caerulea (Riley, 1928)
Iolaus dubiosa (Stempffer & Bennett, 1959)
Iolaus farquharsoni (Bethune-Baker, 1922)
Iolaus flavilinea (Riley, 1928)
Iolaus helenae Henning & Henning, 1989 (endemic)
Iolaus mimosae rhodosense (Stempffer & Bennett, 1959)
Iolaus nasisii (Riley, 1928)
Iolaus nolaensis amanica (Stempffer, 1951)
Iolaus penningtoni (Stempffer & Bennett, 1959)
Iolaus pollux albocaerulea (Riley, 1929)
Iolaus sibella (Druce, 1910)
Iolaus sidus Trimen, 1864
Iolaus stenogrammica (Riley, 1928)
Iolaus violacea (Riley, 1928)
Iolaus pallene (Wallengren, 1857)
Iolaus trimeni Wallengren, 1875
Iolaus gabunica (Riley, 1928)
Iolaus iulus Hewitson, 1869
Iolaus poecilaon fisheri Heath, 1983
Iolaus aequatorialis (Stempffer & Bennett, 1958)
Iolaus cottrelli (Stempffer & Bennett, 1958)
Iolaus dianae Heath, 1983 (endemic)
Iolaus ndolae (Stempffer & Bennett, 1958)
Iolaus pamae Heath, 1994
Iolaus silarus Druce, 1885
Iolaus stewarti Heath, 1985 (endemic)
Iolaus catori cottoni Bethune-Baker, 1908
Stugeta bowkeri maria Suffert, 1904
Stugeta bowkeri tearei Dickson, 1980
Pilodeudorix mimeta (Karsch, 1895)
Pilodeudorix anetia (Hulstaert, 1924)
Pilodeudorix bemba (Neave, 1910) (endemic)
Pilodeudorix kafuensis (Neave, 1910)
Pilodeudorix mera (Hewitson, 1873)
Pilodeudorix otraeda genuba (Hewitson, 1875)
Pilodeudorix obscurata (Trimen, 1891)
Pilodeudorix camerona katanga (Clench, 1965)
Pilodeudorix congoana orientalis (Stempffer, 1957)
Pilodeudorix zela (Hewitson, 1869)
Pilodeudorix zeloides (Butler, 1901)
Pilodeudorix zelomina (Rebel, 1914)
Hypomyrina nomenia extensa Libert, 2004
Deudorix antalus (Hopffer, 1855)
Deudorix badhami Carcasson, 1961
Deudorix caliginosa Lathy, 1903
Deudorix dinochares Grose-Smith, 1887
Deudorix dinomenes Grose-Smith, 1887
Deudorix diocles Hewitson, 1869
Deudorix jacksoni Talbot, 1935
Deudorix kayonza Stempffer, 1956
Deudorix lorisona coffea Jackson, 1966
Deudorix magda Gifford, 1963
Deudorix ufipa Kielland, 1978
Capys brunneus heathi Henning & Henning, 1988
Capys catharus Riley, 1932
Capys connexivus connexivus Butler, 1897
Capys connexivus gardineri Henning & Henning, 1988

Lycaeninae
Lycaena phlaeas abbottii (Holland, 1892)

Polyommatinae

Lycaenesthini
Anthene amarah (Guérin-Méneville, 1849)
Anthene arnoldi (N. Jones, 1918)
Anthene butleri livida (Trimen, 1881)
Anthene contrastata mashuna (Stevenson, 1937)
Anthene crawshayi (Butler, 1899)
Anthene definita (Butler, 1899)
Anthene irumu (Stempffer, 1948)
Anthene kersteni (Gerstaecker, 1871)
Anthene lemnos (Hewitson, 1878)
Anthene ligures (Hewitson, 1874)
Anthene liodes (Hewitson, 1874)
Anthene lunulata (Trimen, 1894)
Anthene mpanda Kielland, 1990
Anthene nigropunctata (Bethune-Baker, 1910)
Anthene otacilia (Trimen, 1868)
Anthene princeps (Butler, 1876)
Anthene rhodesiana Stempffer, 1962
Anthene rubricinctus anadema (Druce, 1905)
Anthene wilsoni (Talbot, 1935)
Anthene gemmifera (Neave, 1910)
Anthene nigeriae (Aurivillius, 1905)
Cupidesthes arescopa (Stempffer, 1962)
Cupidesthes vidua Talbot, 1929

Polyommatini
Cupidopsis cissus (Godart, [1824])
Cupidopsis jobates (Hopffer, 1855)
Pseudonacaduba aethiops (Mabille, 1877)
Pseudonacaduba sichela (Wallengren, 1857)
Lampides boeticus (Linnaeus, 1767)
Uranothauma crawshayi Butler, 1895
Uranothauma cuneatum Tite, 1958
Uranothauma falkensteini (Dewitz, 1879)
Uranothauma heritsia virgo (Butler, 1896)
Uranothauma nubifer (Trimen, 1895)
Uranothauma poggei (Dewitz, 1879)
Uranothauma vansomereni Stempffer, 1951
Uranothauma williamsi Carcasson, 1961
Cacyreus lingeus (Stoll, 1782)
Cacyreus marshalli Butler, 1898
Cacyreus tespis (Herbst, 1804)
Cacyreus virilis Stempffer, 1936
Harpendyreus hazelae Stempffer, 1973
Harpendyreus juno (Butler, 1897)
Harpendyreus major (Joicey & Talbot, 1924)
Leptotes babaulti (Stempffer, 1935)
Leptotes brevidentatus (Tite, 1958)
Leptotes jeanneli (Stempffer, 1935)
Leptotes marginalis (Stempffer, 1944)
Leptotes pirithous (Linnaeus, 1767)
Leptotes pulchra (Murray, 1874)
Tuxentius calice (Hopffer, 1855)
Tuxentius ertli (Aurivillius, 1907)
Tuxentius melaena (Trimen & Bowker, 1887)
Tarucus sybaris (Hopffer, 1855)
Zintha hintza (Trimen, 1864)
Zizeeria knysna (Trimen, 1862)
Zizina antanossa (Mabille, 1877)
Actizera lucida (Trimen, 1883)
Actizera stellata (Trimen, 1883)
Zizula hylax (Fabricius, 1775)
Azanus jesous (Guérin-Méneville, 1849)
Azanus mirza (Plötz, 1880)
Azanus moriqua (Wallengren, 1857)
Azanus natalensis (Trimen & Bowker, 1887)
Azanus ubaldus (Stoll, 1782)
Azanus isis (Drury, 1773)
Eicochrysops eicotrochilus Bethune-Baker, 1924
Eicochrysops hippocrates (Fabricius, 1793)
Eicochrysops messapus mahallakoaena (Wallengren, 1857)
Eicochrysops pinheyi Heath, 1985 (endemic)
Euchrysops albistriata (Capronnier, 1889)
Euchrysops barkeri (Trimen, 1893)
Euchrysops katangae Bethune-Baker, 1923
Euchrysops malathana (Boisduval, 1833)
Euchrysops osiris (Hopffer, 1855)
Euchrysops subpallida Bethune-Baker, 1923
Euchrysops unigemmata (Butler, 1895)
Thermoniphas distincta (Talbot, 1935)
Thermoniphas fontainei Stempffer, 1956
Thermoniphas colorata (Ungemach, 1932)
Oboronia albicosta (Gaede, 1916)
Oboronia guessfeldti (Dewitz, 1879)
Freyeria trochylus (Freyer, [1843])
Lepidochrysops aethiopia (Bethune-Baker, [1923])
Lepidochrysops anerius (Hulstaert, 1924)
Lepidochrysops ansorgei Tite, 1959
Lepidochrysops auratus Quickelberge, 1979
Lepidochrysops carsoni (Butler, 1901) (endemic)
Lepidochrysops chala Kielland, 1980
Lepidochrysops chalceus Quickelberge, 1979
Lepidochrysops chloauges (Bethune-Baker, [1923])
Lepidochrysops cinerea (Bethune-Baker, [1923])
Lepidochrysops cupreus (Neave, 1910)
Lepidochrysops desmondi Stempffer, 1951
Lepidochrysops dollmani (Bethune-Baker, [1923])
Lepidochrysops erici Gardiner, 2003 (endemic)
Lepidochrysops evae Gardiner, 2003 (endemic)
Lepidochrysops glauca (Trimen & Bowker, 1887)
Lepidochrysops handmani Quickelberge, 1980
Lepidochrysops heathi Gardiner, 1998 (endemic)
Lepidochrysops intermedia cottrelli Stempffer, 1954
Lepidochrysops kocak Seven, 1997
Lepidochrysops longifalces Tite, 1961
Lepidochrysops loveni (Aurivillius, 1922)
Lepidochrysops michaeli Gardiner, 2003 (endemic)
Lepidochrysops miniata Gardiner, 2004 (endemic)
Lepidochrysops nyika Tite, 1961
Lepidochrysops pampolis (Druce, 1905)
Lepidochrysops peculiaris hypoleucus (Butler, 1893)
Lepidochrysops plebeia (Butler, 1898)
Lepidochrysops rhodesensae (Bethune-Baker, [1923]) (endemic)
Lepidochrysops skotios (Druce, 1905)
Lepidochrysops solwezii (Bethune-Baker, [1923])
Lepidochrysops stormsi (Robbe, 1892)
Lepidochrysops yvonnae Gardiner, 2004 (endemic)

Riodinidae

Nemeobiinae
Abisara dewitzi Aurivillius, 1898
Abisara rogersi Druce, 1878
Abisara neavei dollmani Riley, 1932

Nymphalidae

Libytheinae
Libythea labdaca laius Trimen, 1879

Danainae

Danaini
Danaus chrysippus orientis (Aurivillius, 1909)
Tirumala formosa (Godman, 1880)
Tirumala petiverana (Doubleday, 1847)
Amauris niavius niavius (Linnaeus, 1758)
Amauris niavius dominicanus Trimen, 1879
Amauris tartarea tartarea Mabille, 1876
Amauris tartarea damoclides Staudinger, 1896
Amauris albimaculata latifascia Talbot, 1940
Amauris crawshayi simulator Talbot, 1926
Amauris dannfelti restricta Talbot, 1940
Amauris echeria katangae Neave, 1910
Amauris echeria serica Talbot, 1940
Amauris ellioti junia (Le Cerf, 1920)
Amauris hyalites Butler, 1874
Amauris ochlea bumilleri Lanz, 1896

Satyrinae

Melanitini
Gnophodes betsimena parmeno Doubleday, 1849
Melanitis leda (Linnaeus, 1758)
Melanitis libya Distant, 1882
Aphysoneura pigmentaria latilimba Le Cerf, 1919

Satyrini
Bicyclus angulosa selousi (Trimen, 1895)
Bicyclus anynana anynana (Butler, 1879)
Bicyclus anynana centralis Condamin, 1968
Bicyclus campina (Aurivillius, 1901)
Bicyclus cooksoni (Druce, 1905)
Bicyclus cottrelli (van Son, 1952)
Bicyclus dubia (Aurivillius, 1893)
Bicyclus ena (Hewitson, 1877)
Bicyclus jefferyi Fox, 1963
Bicyclus mandanes Hewitson, 1873
Bicyclus mesogena (Karsch, 1894)
Bicyclus moyses Condamin & Fox, 1964
Bicyclus safitza (Westwood, 1850)
Bicyclus sandace (Hewitson, 1877)
Bicyclus saussurei (Dewitz, 1879)
Bicyclus sebetus (Hewitson, 1877)
Bicyclus simulacris Kielland, 1990
Bicyclus sophrosyne overlaeti Condamin, 1965
Bicyclus suffusa (Riley, 1921)
Bicyclus trilophus (Rebel, 1914)
Bicyclus vansoni Condamin, 1965
Bicyclus vulgaris (Butler, 1868)
Heteropsis centralis (Aurivillius, 1903)
Heteropsis perspicua (Trimen, 1873)
Heteropsis phaea (Karsch, 1894)
Heteropsis simonsii (Butler, 1877)
Heteropsis teratia (Karsch, 1894)
Heteropsis ubenica (Thurau, 1903)
Ypthima antennata van Son, 1955
Ypthima condamini Kielland, 1982
Ypthima congoana Overlaet, 1955
Ypthima diplommata Overlaet, 1954
Ypthima granulosa Butler, 1883
Ypthima impura paupera Ungemach, 1932
Ypthima praestans Overlaet, 1954
Ypthima pulchra Overlaet, 1954
Ypthima pupillaris Butler, 1888
Ypthima recta Overlaet, 1955
Ypthima rhodesiana Carcasson, 1961
Ypthimomorpha itonia (Hewitson, 1865)
Neocoenyra cooksoni Druce, 1907
Neocoenyra kivuensis Seydel, 1929
Neocoenyra ypthimoides Butler, 1894
Coenyropsis bera (Hewitson, 1877)
Physcaeneura pione Godman, 1880
Neita extensa (Butler, 1898)

Charaxinae

Charaxini
Charaxes varanes vologeses (Mabille, 1876)
Charaxes fulvescens monitor Rothschild, 1900
Charaxes acuminatus cottrelli van Someren, 1963
Charaxes acuminatus nyika van Someren, 1963
Charaxes candiope (Godart, 1824)
Charaxes protoclea azota (Hewitson, 1877)
Charaxes protoclea catenaria Rousseau-Decelle, 1934
Charaxes macclounii Butler, 1895
Charaxes cynthia sabulosus Talbot, 1928
Charaxes lucretius intermedius van Someren, 1971
Charaxes lucretius schofieldi Plantrou, 1989
Charaxes jasius saturnus Butler, 1866
Charaxes castor (Cramer, 1775)
Charaxes brutus angustus Rothschild, 1900
Charaxes brutus natalensis Staudinger, 1885
Charaxes ansorgei levicki Poulton, 1933
Charaxes pollux pollux (Cramer, 1775)
Charaxes pollux geminus Rothschild, 1900
Charaxes druceanus proximans Joicey & Talbot, 1922
Charaxes eudoxus mechowi Rothschild, 1900
Charaxes eudoxus mitchelli Plantrou & Howarth, 1977
Charaxes eudoxus zambiae van Someren, 1970
Charaxes numenes aequatorialis van Someren, 1972
Charaxes tiridates tiridatinus Röber, 1936
Charaxes murphyi Collins, 1989
Charaxes bohemani Felder & Felder, 1859
Charaxes xiphares ludovici Rousseau-Decelle, 1933
Charaxes cithaeron joanae van Someren, 1964
Charaxes imperialis lisomboensis van Someren, 1975
Charaxes ameliae amelina Joicey & Talbot, 1925
Charaxes pythodoris pythodoris Hewitson, 1873
Charaxes pythodoris sumbuensis Henning, 1982
Charaxes penricei Rothschild, 1900
Charaxes achaemenes Felder & Felder, 1867
Charaxes jahlusa argynnides Westwood, 1864
Charaxes eupale veneris White & Grant, 1989
Charaxes dilutus Rothschild, 1898
Charaxes anticlea proadusta van Someren, 1971
Charaxes baumanni selousi Trimen, 1894
Charaxes baumanni whytei Butler, 1894
Charaxes hildebrandti katangensis Talbot, 1928
Charaxes catachrous van Someren & Jackson, 1952
Charaxes etheocles carpenteri van Someren & Jackson, 1957
Charaxes margaretae Rydon, 1980
Charaxes cedreatis Hewitson, 1874
Charaxes chintechi van Someren, 1975
Charaxes manica Trimen, 1894
Charaxes howarthi , 1976
Charaxes fulgurata Aurivillius, 1899
Charaxes phaeus Hewitson, 1877
Charaxes fionae Henning, 1977
Charaxes variata van Someren, 1969 (endemic)
Charaxes diversiforma van Someren & Jackson, 1957
Charaxes williami Henning, 2002 (endemic)
Charaxes aubyni australis van Someren & Jackson, 1957
Charaxes gallagheri van Son, 1962
Charaxes guderiana (Dewitz, 1879)
Charaxes zoolina (Westwood, [1850])
Charaxes nichetes pantherinus Rousseau-Decelle, 1934

Euxanthini
Charaxes crossleyi (Ward, 1871)
Charaxes wakefieldi (Ward, 1873)

Pallini
Palla ussheri interposita Joicey & Talbot, 1925

Nymphalinae
Vanessula milca latifasciata Joicey & Talbot, 1928

Nymphalini
Antanartia schaeneia dubia Howarth, 1966
Vanessa dimorphica (Howarth, 1966)
Vanessa cardui (Linnaeus, 1758)
Junonia artaxia Hewitson, 1864
Junonia hierta cebrene Trimen, 1870
Junonia natalica (Felder & Felder, 1860)
Junonia oenone (Linnaeus, 1758)
Junonia orithya madagascariensis Guenée, 1865
Junonia sophia infracta Butler, 1888
Junonia terea elgiva Hewitson, 1864
Junonia touhilimasa Vuillot, 1892
Junonia ansorgei (Rothschild, 1899)
Junonia cymodoce lugens (Schultze, 1912)
Protogoniomorpha anacardii nebulosa (Trimen, 1881)
Protogoniomorpha parhassus (Drury, 1782)
Precis actia Distant, 1880
Precis antilope (Feisthamel, 1850)
Precis archesia (Cramer, 1779)
Precis ceryne (Boisduval, 1847)
Precis cuama (Hewitson, 1864)
Precis octavia sesamus Trimen, 1883
Precis pelarga (Fabricius, 1775)
Precis rauana (Grose-Smith, 1898)
Precis sinuata Plötz, 1880
Precis tugela pyriformis (Butler, 1896)
Hypolimnas anthedon anthedon (Doubleday, 1845)
Hypolimnas anthedon wahlbergi (Wallengren, 1857)
Hypolimnas misippus (Linnaeus, 1764)
Catacroptera cloanthe (Stoll, 1781)

Cyrestinae

Cyrestini
Cyrestis camillus (Fabricius, 1781)

Biblidinae

Biblidini
Byblia anvatara acheloia (Wallengren, 1857)
Byblia ilithyia (Drury, 1773)
Neptidopsis ophione nucleata Grünberg, 1911
Eurytela dryope angulata Aurivillius, 1899
Eurytela hiarbas lita Rothschild & Jordan, 1903

Epicaliini
Sevenia amulia intermedia (Carcasson, 1961)
Sevenia amulia benguelae (Chapman, 1872)
Sevenia boisduvali (Wallengren, 1857)
Sevenia consors (Rothschild & Jordan, 1903)
Sevenia dubiosa (Strand, 1911)
Sevenia garega (Karsch, 1892)
Sevenia occidentalium (Mabille, 1876)
Sevenia pechueli rhodesiana (Rothschild, 1918)
Sevenia rosa (Hewitson, 1877)
Sevenia trimeni (Aurivillius, 1899)
Sevenia umbrina (Karsch, 1892)

Limenitinae

Limenitidini
Harma theobene superna (Fox, 1968)
Cymothoe caenis (Drury, 1773)
Cymothoe cottrelli Rydon, 1980
Cymothoe confusa Aurivillius, 1887
Cymothoe herminia katshokwe Overlaet, 1940
Cymothoe lurida azumai Carcasson, 1964
Cymothoe sangaris luluana Overlaet, 1945
Pseudoneptis bugandensis ianthe Hemming, 1964
Pseudacraea boisduvalii boisduvalii (Doubleday, 1845)
Pseudacraea boisduvalii trimenii Butler, 1874
Pseudacraea deludens amaurina Neustetter, 1928
Pseudacraea dolomena (Hewitson, 1865)
Pseudacraea eurytus eurytus (Linnaeus, 1758)
Pseudacraea eurytus conradti Oberthür, 1893
Pseudacraea kuenowii Dewitz, 1879
Pseudacraea lucretia expansa (Butler, 1878)
Pseudacraea lucretia protracta (Butler, 1874)
Pseudacraea poggei (Dewitz, 1879)
Pseudacraea semire (Cramer, 1779)

Neptidini
Neptis agouale Pierre-Baltus, 1978
Neptis alta Overlaet, 1955
Neptis aurivillii Schultze, 1913
Neptis carcassoni Van Son, 1959
Neptis conspicua Neave, 1904
Neptis goochii Trimen, 1879
Neptis gratiosa Overlaet, 1955
Neptis incongrua Butler, 1896
Neptis jordani Neave, 1910
Neptis kiriakoffi Overlaet, 1955
Neptis laeta Overlaet, 1955
Neptis nemetes nemetes Hewitson, 1868
Neptis nemetes margueriteae Fox, 1968
Neptis nicoteles Hewitson, 1874
Neptis nina Staudinger, 1896
Neptis nysiades Hewitson, 1868
Neptis penningtoni van Son, 1977
Neptis puella Aurivillius, 1894
Neptis saclava marpessa Hopffer, 1855
Neptis serena Overlaet, 1955
Neptis trigonophora melicertula Strand, 1912

Adoliadini
Catuna crithea (Drury, 1773)
Euryphura achlys (Hopffer, 1855)
Euryphura chalcis (Felder & Felder, 1860)
Euryphura concordia (Hopffer, 1855)
Euryphurana nobilis viridis (Hancock, 1990)
Hamanumida daedalus (Fabricius, 1775)
Pseudargynnis hegemone (Godart, 1819)
Aterica galene extensa Heron, 1909
Euriphene incerta theodota (Hulstaert, 1924)
Euriphene iris (Aurivillius, 1903)
Euriphene pallidior (Hulstaert, 1924)
Euriphene saphirina trioculata (Talbot, 1927)
Bebearia cocalia katera (van Someren, 1939)
Bebearia orientis (Karsch, 1895)
Bebearia plistonax (Hewitson, 1874)
Bebearia aurora theia Hecq, 1989
Bebearia schoutedeni (Overlaet, 1954)
Euphaedra medon neustetteri Niepelt, 1915
Euphaedra zaddachii crawshayi Butler, 1895
Euphaedra herberti katanga Hecq, 1980
Euphaedra overlaeti Hulstaert, 1926
Euphaedra simplex Hecq, 1978
Euphaedra cooksoni Druce, 1905
Euphaedra katangensis Talbot, 1927
Euphaedra nigrobasalis Joicey & Talbot, 1921
Euphaedra ruspina (Hewitson, 1865)
Euphaedra harpalyce serena Talbot, 1928
Euphaedra neophron (Hopffer, 1855)
Euptera freyja Hancock, 1984
Euptera hirundo lufirensis Joicey & Talbot, 1921
Euptera pluto primitiva Hancock, 1984
Pseudathyma callina (Grose-Smith, 1898)

Heliconiinae

Acraeini
Acraea cerasa cerita Sharpe, 1906
Acraea acara Hewitson, 1865
Acraea anemosa Hewitson, 1865
Acraea insignis Distant, 1880
Acraea leucographa Ribbe, 1889
Acraea machequena Grose-Smith, 1887
Acraea neobule Doubleday, 1847
Acraea pseudolycia pseudolycia Butler, 1874
Acraea pseudolycia astrigera Butler, 1899
Acraea zetes (Linnaeus, 1758)
Acraea acrita ambigua Trimen, 1891
Acraea asema Hewitson, 1877
Acraea atolmis Westwood, 1881
Acraea cepheus (Linnaeus, 1758)
Acraea chaeribula Oberthür, 1893
Acraea chambezi Neave, 1910
Acraea diogenes Suffert, 1904
Acraea egina (Cramer, 1775)
Acraea eltringhamiana Le Doux, 1932
Acraea guillemei Oberthür, 1893
Acraea lofua Eltringham, 1911 (endemic)
Acraea mansya Eltringham, 1911
Acraea omrora umbraetae Pierre, 1988
Acraea periphanes Oberthür, 1893
Acraea utengulensis Thurau, 1903
Acraea aglaonice Westwood, 1881
Acraea atergatis Westwood, 1881
Acraea axina Westwood, 1881
Acraea buettneri Rogenhofer, 1890
Acraea caldarena Hewitson, 1877
Acraea intermediodes Ackery, 1995
Acraea leucopyga Aurivillius, 1904
Acraea lygus Druce, 1875
Acraea natalica Boisduval, 1847
Acraea oncaea Hopffer, 1855
Acraea pudorella Aurivillius, 1899
Acraea rhodesiana Wichgraf, 1909
Acraea aganice nicega (Suffert, 1904)
Acraea consanguinea intermedia (Aurivillius, 1899)
Acraea epaea (Cramer, 1779)
Acraea macarista (Sharpe, 1906)
Acraea poggei Dewitz, 1879
Acraea scalivittata (Butler, 1896)
Acraea umbra macarioides (Aurivillius, 1893)
Acraea acerata Hewitson, 1874
Acraea acuta Howarth, 1969
Acraea alciope Hewitson, 1852
Acraea alicia (Sharpe, 1890)
Acraea aurivillii Staudinger, 1896
Acraea baxteri Sharpe, 1902
Acraea bonasia (Fabricius, 1775)
Acraea cabira Hopffer, 1855
Acraea encedana Pierre, 1976
Acraea encedon (Linnaeus, 1758)
Acraea serena (Fabricius, 1775)
Acraea esebria Hewitson, 1861
Acraea goetzei Thurau, 1903
Acraea jodutta (Fabricius, 1793)
Acraea johnstoni Godman, 1885
Acraea lycoa Godart, 1819
Acraea burni Butler, 1896
Acraea peneleos pelasgius Grose-Smith, 1900
Acraea pharsalus Ward, 1871
Acraea sotikensis Sharpe, 1892
Acraea ventura Hewitson, 1877
Acraea bomba Grose-Smith, 1889
Acraea induna Trimen, 1895
Acraea lusinga Overlaet, 1955
Acraea mirifica Lathy, 1906
Acraea parei orangica (Henning & Henning, 1996)
Acraea rahira Boisduval, 1833
Acraea speciosa Wichgraf, 1909
Acraea cinerea Neave, 1904
Acraea ntebiae dewitzi Carcasson, 1981
Acraea oreas angolanus Lathy, 1906
Acraea parrhasia servona Godart, 1819
Acraea perenna Doubleday, 1847
Pardopsis punctatissima (Boisduval, 1833)

Argynnini
Issoria smaragdifera smaragdifera (Butler, 1895)
Issoria smaragdifera reducta Carcasson, 1961
Issoria baumanni katangae (Neave, 1910)

Vagrantini
Lachnoptera anticlia (Hübner, 1819)
Lachnoptera ayresii Trimen, 1879
Phalanta eurytis (Doubleday, 1847)
Phalanta phalantha aethiopica (Rothschild & Jordan, 1903)

Hesperiidae

Coeliadinae
Coeliades forestan (Stoll, [1782])
Coeliades hanno (Plötz, 1879)
Coeliades libeon (Druce, 1875)
Coeliades pisistratus (Fabricius, 1793)
Coeliades sejuncta (Mabille & Vuillot, 1891)

Pyrginae

Celaenorrhinini
Loxolexis hollandi (Druce, 1909)
Loxolexis holocausta (Mabille, 1891)
Celaenorrhinus bettoni Butler, 1902
Celaenorrhinus boadicea (Hewitson, 1877)
Celaenorrhinus handmani Collins & Congdon, 1998
Celaenorrhinus homeyeri (Plötz, 1880)
Eretis djaelaelae (Wallengren, 1857)
Eretis herewardi Riley, 1921
Eretis lugens (Rogenhofer, 1891)
Eretis melania Mabille, 1891
Eretis umbra nox (Neave, 1910)
Eretis vaga Evans, 1937
Sarangesa astrigera Butler, 1894
Sarangesa brigida sanaga Miller, 1964
Sarangesa laelius (Mabille, 1877)
Sarangesa lucidella (Mabille, 1891)
Sarangesa maculata (Mabille, 1891)
Sarangesa maxima Neave, 1910
Sarangesa motozi (Wallengren, 1857)
Sarangesa pandaensis deningi Evans, 1956
Sarangesa penningtoni Evans, 1951 (endemic)
Sarangesa phidyle (Walker, 1870)
Sarangesa seineri Strand, 1909

Tagiadini
Tagiades flesus (Fabricius, 1781)
Eagris decastigma purpura Evans, 1937
Eagris lucetia (Hewitson, 1875)
Eagris nottoana (Wallengren, 1857)
Eagris sabadius ochreana Lathy, 1901
Calleagris hollandi (Butler, 1897)
Calleagris jamesoni (Sharpe, 1890)
Calleagris lacteus (Mabille, 1877)
Caprona pillaana Wallengren, 1857
Netrobalane canopus (Trimen, 1864)
Leucochitonea levubu Wallengren, 1857
Abantis bamptoni Collins & Larsen, 1994
Abantis contigua Evans, 1937
Abantis lucretia lofu Neave, 1910
Abantis paradisea (Butler, 1870)
Abantis tettensis Hopffer, 1855
Abantis venosa Trimen & Bowker, 1889
Abantis vidua Weymer, 1901
Abantis zambesiaca (Westwood, 1874)

Carcharodini
Spialia colotes transvaaliae (Trimen & Bowker, 1889)
Spialia confusa Evans, 1937
Spialia delagoae (Trimen, 1898)
Spialia depauperata (Strand, 1911)
Spialia diomus ferax (Wallengren, 1863)
Spialia dromus (Plötz, 1884)
Spialia mafa (Trimen, 1870)
Spialia secessus (Trimen, 1891)
Spialia spio (Linnaeus, 1764)
Gomalia elma (Trimen, 1862)

Hesperiinae

Aeromachini
Astictopterus abjecta (Snellen, 1872)
Astictopterus punctulata (Butler, 1895)
Astictopterus stellata mineni (Trimen, 1894)
Prosopalpus debilis (Plötz, 1879)
Prosopalpus styla Evans, 1937
Ampittia capenas blanda Evans, 1947
Kedestes barberae (Trimen, 1873)
Kedestes brunneostriga (Plötz, 1884)
Kedestes callicles (Hewitson, 1868)
Kedestes heathi Hancock & Gardiner, 1982 (endemic)
Kedestes lema lema Neave, 1910
Kedestes lema linka Evans, 1956
Kedestes malua Neave, 1910 (endemic)
Kedestes michaeli Gardiner & Hancock, 1982
Kedestes mohozutza (Wallengren, 1857)
Kedestes nerva paola Plötz, 1884
Kedestes protensa Butler, 1901
Kedestes pinheyi Hancock & Gardiner, 1982 (endemic)
Kedestes straeleni Evans, 1956
Kedestes wallengrenii (Trimen, 1883)
Gorgyra aretina (Hewitson, 1878)
Gorgyra bibulus Riley, 1929
Gorgyra diva Evans, 1937
Gorgyra johnstoni (Butler, 1894)
Gorgyra kalinzu Evans, 1949
Gorgyra mocquerysii Holland, 1896
Teniorhinus harona (Westwood, 1881)
Teniorhinus herilus (Hopffer, 1855)
Teniorhinus ignita (Mabille, 1877)
Ceratrichia semilutea Mabille, 1891
Ceratrichia semlikensis Joicey & Talbot, 1921
Pardaleodes fan (Holland, 1894)
Pardaleodes incerta (Snellen, 1872)
Xanthodisca vibius (Hewitson, 1878)
Acada biseriata (Mabille, 1893)
Parosmodes morantii (Trimen, 1873)
Paracleros biguttulus (Mabille, 1890)
Osphantes ogowena lulua Evans, 1956
Acleros mackenii (Trimen, 1868)
Acleros ploetzi Mabille, 1890
Semalea arela (Mabille, 1891)
Semalea atrio (Mabille, 1891)
Semalea pulvina (Plötz, 1879)
Semalea sextilis (Plötz, 1886)
Hypoleucis ophiusa ophir Evans, 1937
Meza larea (Neave, 1910)
Meza gardineri Collins & Larsen, 2008
Paronymus nevea (Druce, 1910)
Paronymus xanthias kiellandi Congdon & Collins, 1998
Andronymus caesar philander (Hopffer, 1855)
Andronymus fenestrella Bethune-Baker, 1908
Andronymus hero Evans, 1937
Andronymus marina Evans, 1937
Andronymus neander (Plötz, 1884)
Chondrolepis niveicornis (Plötz, 1883)
Chondrolepis telisignata (Butler, 1896)
Zophopetes cerymica (Hewitson, 1867)
Zophopetes dysmephila (Trimen, 1868)
Gamia shelleyi (Sharpe, 1890)
Artitropa cama Evans, 1937
Artitropa comus (Stoll, 1782)
Artitropa milleri Riley, 1925
Artitropa reducta Aurivillius, 1925
Gretna balenge (Holland, 1891)
Gretna carmen capra Evans, 1937
Pteroteinon caenira (Hewitson, 1867)
Pteroteinon concaenira Belcastro & Larsen, 1996
Leona maracanda (Hewitson, 1876)
Leona leonora dux Evans, 1937
Leona halma Evans, 1937
Caenides dacela (Hewitson, 1876)
Monza punctata (Aurivillius, 1910)
Fresna cojo (Karsch, 1893)
Fresna netopha (Hewitson, 1878)
Fresna nyassae (Hewitson, 1878)
Platylesches affinissima Strand, 1921
Platylesches batangae (Holland, 1894)
Platylesches chamaeleon (Mabille, 1891)
Platylesches galesa (Hewitson, 1877)
Platylesches lamba Neave, 1910
Platylesches langa Evans, 1937
Platylesches moritili (Wallengren, 1857)
Platylesches heathi Collins & Larsen, 2008
Platylesches neba (Hewitson, 1877)
Platylesches picanini (Holland, 1894)
Platylesches robustus Neave, 1910
Platylesches shona Evans, 1937
Platylesches tina Evans, 1937
Platylesches hassani Collins & Larsen, 2008

Baorini
Brusa allardi Berger, 1967
Brusa saxicola (Neave, 1910)
Zenonia anax Evans, 1937
Zenonia zeno (Trimen, 1864)
Pelopidas mathias (Fabricius, 1798)
Pelopidas thrax (Hübner, 1821)
Borbo borbonica (Boisduval, 1833)
Borbo detecta (Trimen, 1893)
Borbo fallax (Gaede, 1916)
Borbo fanta (Evans, 1937)
Borbo fatuellus (Hopffer, 1855)
Borbo gemella (Mabille, 1884)
Borbo holtzi (Plötz, 1883)
Borbo micans (Holland, 1896)
Borbo perobscura (Druce, 1912)
Borbo sirena (Evans, 1937)
Parnara monasi (Trimen & Bowker, 1889)
Gegenes hottentota (Latreille, 1824)
Gegenes niso brevicornis (Plötz, 1884)
Gegenes pumilio gambica (Mabille, 1878)

Heteropterinae
Metisella abdeli (Krüger, 1928)
Metisella angolana (Karsch, 1896)
Metisella carsoni (Butler, 1898)
Metisella formosus linda Evans, 1937
Metisella kambove (Neave, 1910)
Metisella midas (Butler, 1894)
Metisella trisignatus tanga Evans, 1937
Metisella willemi (Wallengren, 1857)
Tsitana wallacei (Neave, 1910)
Lepella lepeletier (Latreille, 1824)

See also
List of moths of Zambia
Wildlife of Zambia
Ecoregions of Zambia

References

Seitz, A. Die Gross-Schmetterlinge der Erde 13: Die Afrikanischen Tagfalter. Plates
Seitz, A. Die Gross-Schmetterlinge der Erde 13: Die Afrikanischen Tagfalter. Text 

Zambia
Zambia
Butterflies